Charles Luman Knapp (July 4, 1847 – January 3, 1929) was an American politician from New York.

Life
Born on a farm near Harrisburg, New York, Knapp attended the rural schools; Lowville (New York) Academy; and Irving Institute in Tarrytown, New York. He graduated from Rutgers College in 1869. Then he studied law, was admitted to the bar in 1873, and practiced in Lowville.

He was a member of the New York State Senate in 1886 and 1887. He was appointed by President Benjamin Harrison as consul general at Montreal in 1889, and remained on the post until September 1893, when he returned to Lowville and resumed the practice of law. He also engaged in banking.

Knapp was elected as a Republican to the 57th Congress to fill the vacancy caused by the death of Albert D. Shaw, and was re-elected to the 58th, 59th, 60th and 61st United States Congresses, holding office from November 5, 1901, to March 3, 1911. He was Chairman of the House Committee on Elections No. 1 (61st Congress).

He resumed the practice of law in Lowville, died there on January 3, 1929, and was buried at the Lowville Rural Cemetery.

Sources

External links

 

1847 births
1929 deaths
Rutgers University alumni
Republican Party New York (state) state senators
Republican Party members of the United States House of Representatives from New York (state)